Gabriella Lengyel (born 18 August 1960) is a Hungarian volleyball player. She competed in the women's tournament at the 1980 Summer Olympics.

References

1960 births
Living people
Hungarian women's volleyball players
Olympic volleyball players of Hungary
Volleyball players at the 1980 Summer Olympics
Sportspeople from Szeged